{{Speciesbox
| image = FMIB 39270 Balanus galeatus From station 4432.jpeg
| image_caption = Conopea galeata on Leptogorgia virgulata
| genus = Conopea
| species = galeata
| authority =(Linnaeus, 1771)
| synonyms = *Balanus galeatus (Linnaeus, 1771)
| synonyms_ref = 
}}Conopea galeata is a species of colonial barnacle in the family Archaeobalanidae. It lives exclusively on gorgonians in the western Atlantic Ocean, the Caribbean Sea and the Gulf of Mexico.

The basal plate by which it adheres to its host gorgonian is boat-shaped. The other main plates are the carina and the carinolaterals, but these are not visible because the coenenchyme (soft tissue) of the host overgrows the plates of the barnacle, apart from a gap through which the crustacean extends its cirri to feed. The plates have brown and white markings, but the barnacle may take on the gorgonian's colouring, which may be some shade of red, purple, orange, yellow or white.

The species is androdioecous.

Ecology

A number of different invertebrates live in symbiosis with L. virgulata. Besides C. galeata, these include a small shrimp Neopontonides beaufortensis, a nudibranch Tritonia wellsi, a bivalve mollusc Pteria colymbus, two species of copepod and a gastropod mollusc Simnialena uniplicata. The gorgonian uses chemical defences to prevent barnacles, bryozoans and algae from growing on the twigs, exuding protective chemicals which inhibit settlement of their larvae. However, the larvae of C. galeata settle on the old egg masses of the snail S. uniplicata'', before drilling down to the gorgonian's axis and anchoring themselves in place. When the egg mass has disintegrated, the coenenchyme grows to envelop the barnacle, apart from a narrow opening. The presence of the barnacle causes a significant bump on its host.

References

Archaeobalanidae
Crustaceans of the Atlantic Ocean
Animals described in 1771
Taxa named by Carl Linnaeus